José Luis Elías Ávalos (born 8 December 1954) is a Peruvian lawyer and politician. He was a congressman of the Republic on two occasions during the parliamentary period 2000–2001 and the parliamentary period 2011–2016. He is set to return to Congress after a five-year absence in 2021.

Biography 
He was born in Ica, Peru, on 8 December 1954, the son of Luis Abraham Elías Ghezzi and Hilda Graciela Ávalos Valdez. His brother Miguel Ángel Elías Ávalos was also a Congressman for Ica.

He completed his primary and secondary studies in his city of Lima graduating from the Great School Unit Our Lady of Guadalupe.

Between 1976 and 1983 he studied law at the Federico Villarreal National University in Lima. Since 2002 he was a director of the San Juan Bautista Private University. Likewise, he is indicated as owners of large tracts of land in the department of Ica, acquired during his tenure as a Fujimorista congressman.

Political career 
His first political participation occurred in the 1995 elections when he was a candidate for Congress under the Fujimorist Cambio 90-New Majority without obtaining representation.

In the 2000 elections, he was elected Congressman by the "Agrupación Independiente Avancemos" for the parliamentary period 2000–2005. However, after being elected, he formed the group of defectors who resigned from his party and went over to Peru 2000 (Fujimorism).

After the fall of the Fujimori dictatorship, his parliamentary position was reduced until 2001 when new presidential elections were called.

In the 2001 elections, he tried to be reelected as a candidate for the department of Ica of the "People’s Solution" alliance made up of former members of Fujimori, however he did not obtain representation.

In the 2011 elections, he again ran for Congress under Force 2011 and was elected Congressman for Ica for the 2011-2016 parliamentary term. During his second term as a congressman, he participated in the formulation of 146 bills, of which 30 were approved as law of the republic.

Finally, he participated in the 2018 regional elections as Go on Country candidate for the regional governorship of Ica without obtaining the election. He seeks his re-election as a congressman for Ica in the 2021 general elections for the Podemos Peru party, in which he was elected for the 2021–2026 term.

References 

Fujimorista politicians
Living people
Members of the Congress of the Republic of Peru
1954 births
People from Ica Region
Podemos Perú politicians